Jacques Gabriel Barreau (21 January 1923 – 11 November 2019) was a French footballer.  He competed in the men's tournament at the 1952 Summer Olympics.

References

External links
 

1923 births
2019 deaths
French footballers
Olympic footballers of France
Footballers at the 1952 Summer Olympics
Association football midfielders
Footballers from Hauts-de-Seine
People from Levallois-Perret